Muzzle-loading guns (as opposed to muzzle-loading mortars and howitzers) are an early type of artillery, (often field artillery, but naval artillery and siege artillery were other types of muzzleloading artillery), used before, and even for some time after, breech-loading cannon became common. Projectile (shot, and later shell) and powder charge are loaded via the muzzle and rammed down the barrel, and then fired at the target. Muzzle-loading artillery came in smoothbore and rifled form, the rifled guns increasingly taking over from the smoothbores as time past and technology improved. Most were made of bronze because of a lack of metallurgic technology, but cast and wrought-iron guns were common as well, particularly later on. Muzzleloading artillery evolved across a wide range of styles, beginning with the bombard, and evolving into culverins, falconets, sakers, demi-cannon, rifled muzzle-loaders, Parrott rifles, and many other styles. Handcannons are excepted from this list because they are hand-held and typically of small caliber.

Smoothbore muzzle-loading cannon

Rifled muzzle-loading cannon

See also 
 Artillery
 Bombard
 Cannon
 Culverin

Notes and references

 
Muzzle-loading gun